Etelka Anne Leadlay B.Sc., M.Sc., Ph.D.(born 1947), is a botanist.

Born in Lambeth on 16 September 1947, she attended St Mary's School, Calne, Wiltshire. Later she studied Plant taxonomy at the University of Reading, and was elected a Fellow of the Linnean Society in 1978.

She worked for over 20 years for Botanic Gardens Conservation International (BGCI), based on Kew Green, as Head of Research and Membership Services, until she retired in 2007.

Etelka married John F Davey in 1978 and had a daughter Seraphina Elizabeth (born 1983).

Selected publications

 The Darwin Technical Manual for Botanic Gardens. Etelka Leadlay (Editor), Jane Greene (Editor). (1998). Botanic Gardens Conservation International (BGCI). 
 Report of the 2nd World Botanic Gardens Congress, Barcelona, Spain. (2004). BGjournal 1(1) 7–14. 
 The BGCI contribution to the implementation of the Global Strategy for Plant Conservation. Leadlay, E., Sharrock, S., & Simiyu, S. (2005). BGjournal, 2(2), 3–7. 
 Taxonomy and plant conservation: the cornerstone of the conservation and the sustainable use of plants. Leadlay, Etelka and Jury, Stephen (eds.). Cambridge University Press, Cambridge (2006) 
 The International Agenda for Botanic Gardens in Conservation and the 2010 Targets for Botanic Gardens. (2006). BGjournal (1) 3–4. 
 Report on 3rd Global Botanic Gardens Congress Wuhan, China. (2007). BGjournal 4(2) 34–35.

References 

1947 births
People educated at St Mary's School, Calne
British women botanists
People from Lambeth
Living people
Alumni of the University of Reading
British conservationists